Trenay is a hamlet in the parish of St Neot, Cornwall, England, United Kingdom.

References

Hamlets in Cornwall